"" ("Earth, sing") is a German Catholic hymn with a text by Johannes Cardinal of Geissel, Archbishop of Cologne, written in 1837 as a Christmas carol in ten stanzas. The current Catholic hymnal  has only four stanzas as GL 411, which are in the general section of praise.

History 
Johannes Geissel wrote the lyrics in 1837 as a Christmas carol in ten stanzas.

The song "" is titled "" (The shepherds sing for the sleeping Saviour), a pastoral lullaby in a triple metre. The same melody was used also for "" and is the current melody, with only slight changes reducing ornaments and melismas.

When the German Catholic hymnal  was compiled in 1975, the song was not chosen for the common section, but was part of most regional sections. In the current  of 2013, it appears in the common section, but in only four stanzas, and as GL 411, which is in the general section of praise, not noticeably related to Christmas.

Content 
Geissel used only some elements from the eight stanzas of the model "", in which wind, snow and rain are called to silence in order to not disturb the slumber of the baby. Being created by God, the natural forces have to obey, and praise by becoming silent.

This idea of praise by all creation is the main theme of Geissel from the beginning. All creatures are not called to silence, but to loud praise of the incarnation in singing and rejoicing. Several of the ten stanzas anticipate the Passion of Jesus, but only one of these (No. 9) became part of the current version (No. 3). It is the only one of the four current stanzas with an allusion to Christmas: "" (To rescue us all, he himself carried our chains), while the others focus of the praise of all creatures. The song is listed in the section  (Praise, thanks, and adoration). Several regions use it for Thanksgiving.

Text 
The text is from the shortened version in the current .

Melody 

Colin Mawby created a setting for mixed four-part choir with organ ad libitum in 2012.

References

External links 

 GGB 411: Erde, singe, dass es klinge on YouTube
 Erde singe, dass es klinge / Gotteslob 411 pueri-cantores.info

German-language Christmas carols
Catholic hymns in German
19th-century hymns in German
1837 songs